Knute "Skip" Berger (born December 5, 1953) is an American journalist, writer and editor based in Seattle, Washington, United States.

Berger is a columnist for Crosscut.com, writing under the name "Mossback".  He is also Editor-at-Large and a columnist for Seattle magazine, author of Pugetopolis, and former longtime editor of the Seattle Weekly.

His writing focuses on Pacific Northwest subjects including heritage, culture, politics and historic preservation.

Berger writes frequently about World's Fairs, seven of which he has attended, including the  Century 21 Exposition in his hometown of Seattle. In 2011, Berger was named "Writer in Residence" at the landmark of the 1962 Century 21 Expo, the Space Needle, in anticipation of the Expo's Fiftieth Anniversary. Commissioned by the owners of the Space Needle, he penned its official history for the anniversary in Space Needle: The Spirit of Seattle, published in 2012.

As part of the partnership between sister organizations Crosscut and KCTS-TV, Berger began hosting a short television series entitled "Mossback's Northwest" in 2018. In the series, he discusses a part of the Northwest's cultural history.

Bibliography

References

External links

 Berger's 'Space Needle, The Spirit of Seattle' blog

1953 births
Living people
American magazine editors
American magazine journalists
Writers from Seattle
Historians from Washington (state)